Barnesville station in Barnesville, Maryland, is a passenger rail station on the MARC Brunswick Line between Washington, D.C., and Martinsburg, WV (with an extension to Frederick, MD). It is located at 8 Beallsville Road (MD 109) in Barnesville, Maryland. The station house is located on the southwest corner of the  railroad bridge over Beallsville Road, while parking is available on the northwest and southwest corners of the railroad bridge.

Station layout
The station is not compliant with the Americans with Disabilities Act of 1990.

References

External links
 station official website
 Barnesville MARC station (Road and Rail Pictures)

Brunswick Line
Former Baltimore and Ohio Railroad stations
Railway stations in Montgomery County, Maryland
MARC Train stations